Homeobox protein DBX2, also known as developing brain homeobox protein 2, is a protein that in humans is encoded by the DBX2 gene. DBX2 plays an important role in the development of the central nervous system, specifically in the development of the neural tube and brain. DBX2 is located on chromosome 12 and is approximately 36,000 base pairs long. DBX2 is predicted to enable DNA-binding transcription activity as well as being involved in the regulation of transcription by RNA polymerase II.

Identification 
Dbx (developing brain homeobox) was first isolated from a gestational day 13.5 mouse in 1992. There are two Dbx genes (DBX1 and DBX2) which are both important for development of the central nervous system. DBX2 shows conserved expression patterns in the developing brain and spinal cord and plays an important role in neural patterning and differentiation.

Associated Diseases 
DBX2 has been found to play an important role in the development of Glioblastoma which is a lethal brain cancer with poor prognosis. A high expression of DBX2 has been linked to large tumor size in Hepatocellular Carcinoma (HCC) while a downregulated expression of DBX2 has been associated with Endometrial Cancer (EC).

References